Convenient Food Mart (CFM) is a chain of convenience stores in the United States. The private company's headquarters are located in Mentor, Ohio, and there are currently approximately 325 stores located in the US. Convenient Food Mart operates on the franchise system.

Convenient Food Mart was the nation's third-largest chain of convenience stores as of 1988. The NASDAQ exchange dropped Convenient Food Mart the same year when the company failed to meet financial reporting requirements.

Carden & Cherry advertised Convenient Food Mart with the Ernest character in the 1980s.

References 

Companies based in Ohio
Economy of the Midwestern United States
Economy of the Northeastern United States
American companies established in 1958
Retail companies established in 1958
Convenience stores of the United States
Franchises
1958 establishments in Illinois